Svetlana Anatolyevna Karpeyeva (also Svetlana Karpeeva, ; born October 16, 1985) is a Russian swimmer, who specialized in freestyle and individual medley events. She has been selected to the Russian swimming team in a medley double at the 2008 Summer Olympics, and also claimed three bronze medals in a major international competition, spanning two editions of the Summer Universiade (2007 and 2009).

Karpeeva competed in a medley double, and as a member of the Russian swimming team in the freestyle relay at the 2008 Summer Olympics in Beijing. Leading up to the Games, she fired off a fantastic 2:14.13 to wrest the 200 m individual medley title and slide under the FINA A-cut (2:15.27) at the Santa Clara Invitational meet in California.

On the first night of the Games, Karpeeva swam her first two events with only 30 minutes in between. First, she fought off a sprint freestyle challenge from Mexico's Susana Escobar in heat two of the 400 m individual medley, before fading to sixth place and thirty-first overall in 4:50.22. Half an hour later, Karpeeva and her Russian teammates Daria Belyakina, Yelena Sokolova, and Anastasia Aksenova claimed a distant sixth spot and twelfth overall in the 4 × 100 m freestyle relay with a time of 3:42.52. Diving into the pool at the final exchange, she produced an anchor split of 55.52 seconds.

Three days later, Karpeeva missed the top eight final of the 200 m individual medley with a thirteenth-place time in 2:13.26. One night earlier, she scored a solid 2:12.94 on the rear of the dominant breaststroke leg to grab the last semifinal seed, following her fourth-place finish in heat four.

Karpeeva is also a resident athlete of King Aquatic Club in Federal Way, Washington, where she trained with numerous world-class swimmers including Margaret Hoelzer and Megan Jendrick of the United States, and Heather Brand, a butterfly specialist from Zimbabwe.

References

External links
NBC 2008 Olympics profile
Profile – Infosport.ru

1985 births
Living people
Russian female swimmers
Olympic swimmers of Russia
Swimmers at the 2008 Summer Olympics
Russian female freestyle swimmers
Russian female medley swimmers
Universiade medalists in swimming
Sportspeople from Omsk
People from Federal Way, Washington
Universiade bronze medalists for Russia
Medalists at the 2007 Summer Universiade
Medalists at the 2009 Summer Universiade